Yssingeaux is a commune and subprefecture in the Haute-Loire department in south-central France.

It is situated between Le Puy-en-Velay and Firminy.

Geography
The river Lignon du Velay flows through the commune.

Population

See also
Communes of the Haute-Loire department

References

Communes of Haute-Loire
Subprefectures in France
Velay